Dávid Disztl (born 5 January 1985 in Hungary) is a forward striker footballer. He currently plays for KA Akureyri. He was on the Hungarian Cup winner with FC Fehérvár in 2006 and with Budapest Honvéd FC in 2007.

References

External links
Profile on hlsz.hu 
NS online profile 

Profile on allsoccerplayers.com

1985 births
Living people
Sportspeople from Székesfehérvár
Hungarian footballers
Association football forwards
MTK Budapest FC players
Szolnoki MÁV FC footballers
Fehérvár FC players
BFC Siófok players
Budapest Honvéd FC players
FC Felcsút players
Knattspyrnufélag Akureyrar players
Þór Akureyri players
Hungarian expatriate footballers
Hungarian expatriate sportspeople in Iceland
Expatriate footballers in Iceland